Seron is a surname. Notable people with the surname include:

 Carroll Seron, American sociologist
 Devon Seron (born 1993), Filipina actress and television personality
 Guillaume Séron, Belgian water polo player
 Pierre Seron (1942–2017), Belgian comic book artist